State Road 90 (NM 90) is a state highway in the US state of New Mexico. NM 90's southern terminus is at U.S. Route 70 (US 70) north of Lordsburg, and the northern terminus is in Silver City at US 180.

Major intersections

See also

References

090
Transportation in Hidalgo County, New Mexico
Transportation in Grant County, New Mexico